"Seven Spanish Angels" is a song written by Troy Seals and Eddie Setser, and recorded by Ray Charles as a duet with Willie Nelson.  It was released in November 1984 as a single from Charles' 1984 album Friendship.  Charles and Nelson split the verses, with Charles singing the first and Nelson the second, Charles sang the first and second choruses with Nelson joining for the outro. It was also included on Nelson's 1985 compilation album Half Nelson.  "Seven Spanish Angels" was the most successful of Charles' eight hits on the country chart.  The single spent one week at number one and a total of twelve weeks on the country chart.

Setser had suggested the title "Seven Spanish Angels" and he and Seals had written the song as a homage to the tejano flavored classic hits of Marty Robbins exemplified by Robbins' career record "El Paso" (Troy Seals quote): "When we finished it we thought 'Who in the world's gonna do it?' because Marty was [deceased]." Within two days "Seven Spanish Angels" had been successfully pitched to Willie Nelson. Before Nelson was able to record it, producer Billy Sherrill happened to hear the demo and wanted the song for Ray Charles. Sherrill proposed that Nelson and Charles duet on the song after learning of Nelson's having reserved it.

Content
The song is about an outlaw and his lover who are trying to outrun a posse sent to return them to Texas. When they are cornered, they decide to fight the approaching lawmen. Before the final gunfight, the two embrace, speaking of their belief that God will spare them. The gunfight then commences, with the outlaw firing upon the posse. He is immediately shot and killed, prompting his distraught lover to pick up his rifle. She tearfully prays, "Father, please forgive me; I can't make it without my man." She deliberately points the empty weapon at the lawmen and is then shot dead. After each death, the titular angels gather to pray for the lovers. This is followed by "thunder from the throne" and the angels "tak[ing] another angel home". Seals stated that "We tried to make [the story] ethereal but also believable". As written the song included the lines: "Now the people in the valley swear/ That when the moon's just right/ They see the Texan and his woman/ Ride across the clouds at night", which Sherrill preferred not to record feeling the track would run too long.

Charts

Weekly charts

Year-end charts

Cover versions
Canadian artist Corb Lund released his cover on the 2019 album Cover Your Tracks. 
Alison Krauss and Jamey Johnson covered the song at the 2015 Gershwin prize tribute concert in Washington D.C. with Nelson and his wife in attendance on November 18, 2015. (Nelson received the Library of Congress Gershwin Prize for Popular Song).

References

1984 singles
Ray Charles songs
Willie Nelson songs
George Canyon songs
Songs written by Troy Seals
Song recordings produced by Billy Sherrill
Male vocal duets
Columbia Records singles
Songs written by Eddie Setser
1984 songs
Songs about suicide